The American Catholic Quarterly Review was an American quarterly magazine of literature, politics, culture, religion, and the arts, founded in 1876 by James A. Corcoran and Herman J. Heuser. The journal was conceived as a forum for public discussion and a tool for elite education. The magazine ceased publication in 1924.

Notable contributors

 Orestes Brownson
 Giovanni Battista de Rossi
 James Gibbons
 Isaac Hecker
 John Keane
 Patrick Neeson Lynch
 Henry Edward Manning
 St. George Jackson Mivart
 James O'Connor
 Patrick John Ryan
 Charles Seghers
 John Gilmary Shea
 John L. Spalding
 George Tyrrell

See also

 Lists of magazines
 Media in Philadelphia

References

External links
 The American Catholic Quarterly Review, at Internet Archive (digitized issues, various dates)
 The American Catholic Quarterly Review, at Hathi Trust 
 The American Catholic Quarterly Review: General Index (1876–1900)

Defunct political magazines published in the United States
Quarterly magazines published in the United States
Defunct literary magazines published in the United States
Conservative magazines published in the United States
Magazines disestablished in 1924
Magazines established in 1876
Magazines published in Philadelphia
1876 establishments in Pennsylvania